Gabal is a surname. Notable people with the surname include:

Mohamed Abou Gabal (born 1989), Egyptian footballer
Mohamed Gabal (born 1984), Egyptian volleyball player